Sandneshamn is a village in Tromsø Municipality in Troms og Finnmark county, Norway. The village consists of an old 1930s house and several newer cabins. The village is home to fish farming and a kiosk store. The Otervik Tunnel is located immediately west of this village.

References

Tromsø
Villages in Troms